The Clemson Tigers men's soccer team represent Clemson University in the Atlantic Coast Conference of NCAA Division I soccer. The program has won 3 NCAA national championships, 14 Atlantic Coast Conference championships,  and hosted 3 Hermann Trophy winners (Bruce Murray in 1987, Wojtek Krakowiak in 1998, and Robbie Robinson in 2019).

History

Clemson began sponsoring a soccer team in 1934, playing a hybrid schedule of colleges and prep schools.  The team was discontinued after the 1939 season.  In 1967, the university decided to re-add soccer as a varsity sport.  Dr. I. M. Ibrahim, who was a chemistry professor at the time, was chosen to lead the program.  In the program's inaugural season, the team posted a 6–5 record.  From 1967 to 1971, the Tigers posted four winning seasons overall, but were consistently in the bottom tier of the ACC.

The 1972 season proved to be a breakout year for the Tigers.  The Tigers went undefeated in conference play to capture the first of eight straight ACC titles and finished the year with a 13–1–1 record and earned their first trip to the NCAA tournament. The 1973 season would prove to be even more successful, as the Tigers went 16–1 and made it to the semifinals of the NCAA tournament.  By the end of the decade, the Tigers had 8 conference titles, 3 trips to the round of 16 in the NCAA tournament, an Elite 8 appearance, 3 Final Four appearances, and finished the 1979 season as national runners-up.

Clemson's streak of ACC titles and NCAA appearances was broken during the 1980 season, but the Tigers rebounded with conference titles during the 1981, 1982, and 1985 seasons (Clemson's last before the ACC adopted its tournament format) and five straight appearances in the NCAA tournament.  The 1984 season saw the Tigers finally reach the summit of national prominence, as the Tigers went 22–4 against a very tough schedule and won the 1984 National Championship.  During the 1984 NCAA Tournament, Clemson had to face the top four seeds in the tournament (Alabama A&M, Virginia, UCLA, and Indiana).  After failing to make the NCAA tournament in 1986, the Tigers earned their second national championship during the 1987 season.  The Tigers finished the 1987 regular season 13–5–1, but had struggled during conference play.  Reportedly, the Tigers were the 23rd team selected for the 24-team NCAA tournament.  The Tigers, however, won three straight road games, which included an upset of #1-ranked Indiana (who hadn't lost an NCAA tournament home game prior to the match), and was chosen to host the Final Four at Riggs Field.  In the semifinals, the Tigers avenged two earlier losses to North Carolina and, in the championship game, knocked off San Diego State (another surprise finalist).  In addition, Bruce Murray won the 1987 Hermann Trophy (the first Clemson player to win the award).

The 1990s saw the first change of head coaches in school history, as Dr. Ibrahim retired after the 1994 season and was replaced by Brown head coach Trevor Adair.  The Tigers captured their first ACC Tournament championship in 1998, won 3 ACC regular season titles (1990, 1993, and 1998), and had another player honored with the Hermann Trophy (Wojtek Krakowiak, 1998).  The Tigers made 6 appearances in the NCAA tournament, with their best finishes being trips to the Elite 8 in 1997 and 1998.

During the 2001 season, the Tigers captured their second ACC Tournament championship and advanced to the Elite 8.  After another Elite 8 run in 2002, the Tigers experienced a down time, failing to advance out of the first round in 2003 and missing the NCAA tournament altogether in 2004. The 2005 squad, however, would make a strong run during the NCAA tournament, advancing to the Final Four for the first time since the 1987 squad's national title.

The 2006 team would make the round of 16, falling to eventual runner-up UCLA. The 2008 squad, despite not making the tournament, was one of only two teams in the country to defeat both national champion Maryland and national runner-up North Carolina during the season.

Trevor Adair resigned as head coach of the Tigers on June 16, 2009, two months after being placed on a leave of absence after reportedly assaulting his two daughters during a domestic dispute. Assistant coach Phil Hindson was promoted to interim head coach for the 2009 season, marking only the second change in head coaches in Tiger history.  The Tigers struggled through the 2009 season, finishing with a final record of 6–12–1 despite a victory over national champion Virginia during the season.

On January 5, 2010, it was announced that former Brown head coach Mike Noonan was hired as Clemson's fourth head soccer coach. Since Coach Noonan took over, the Tigers have slowly risen back to prominence, returning to the NCAA tournament in 2013 and winning their 14th ACC championship in 2014. In 2015, the Tigers advanced to the finals of the NCAA College Cup for the first time since 1987, falling in the national championship match to Stanford.  In 2016, the Tigers finished runners up in the ACC Tournament and advanced to the Quarterfinals of the NCAA Tournament. In 2019, the Tigers would win the ACC Atlantic Division, finished runners up in the ACC tournament, and advanced to the NCAA Tournament Quarterfinals. In addition, Robbie Robinson became the third Clemson player to win the Hermann Trophy.  Robinson was drafted first overall in the 2020 MLS SuperDraft, becoming the first Clemson men's soccer player to be drafted first overall.  2021 was a landmark year for the program and coach Noonan as the Tigers won the national title for the third time in program history and had a school-record six players drafted in the MLS Draft.

Personnel

Roster

Coaching staff

Seasons

Notable alumni

  Wolde Harris (1993-1995) – Former MLS player, currently Asst Coach Colorado Rapids, Clemson All-Time Career Goalscorer, Clemson Athletic Hall of Fame 2017
  Paul Stalteri (1995–1996) 
  John Wilson (1995–1998)
  Oguchi Onyewu (2000–2001)
  Stuart Holden (2003–2004) – Currently Fox Sports TV Analyst 
  Joe Bendik (2006–2009) – Currently with Philadelphia Union
  Cody Mizell (2010–2012) – Currently with NYCFC
  Amadou Dia (2011–2014) – Currently with Louisville City
  Phanuel Kavita (2011–2014) – Currently with Birmingham Legion
  Kyle Murphy (2011–2015) – Currently with Miami FC
  Andrew Tarbell (2012–2015) – Currently with Houston Dynamo
  Tommy McNamara (2013) – Currently with New England Revolution
  Aaron Jones (2014–2016) – Currently with King's Lynn Town
  Oliver Shannon (2014–2017) – Currently with Bala Town
  Diego Campos (2014–2017) – Currently with Degerfors
  Grayson Barber (2015–2018) – Currently with Charlotte Independence
  Ximo Miralles (2016–2017) – Currently with Logroñés
  Robbie Robinson (2017–2019) – Currently with Inter Miami
  Quinn McNeill (2017–2021) – Currently with Charlotte FC
  Charlie Asensio (2018–2021) – Currently with Austin FC
  Luis Felipe Fernandez-Salvador (2018–2021) – Currently with Whitecaps FC 2
  George Marks (2018–2021) – Currently with Charlotte FC
  Philip Mayaka (2019–2020) – Currently with Charlotte FC
  Oskar Ågren (2019–2021) – Currently with San Jose Earthquakes

References

Bibliography

External links

 

 
Soccer clubs in South Carolina
1934 establishments in South Carolina
Association football clubs established in 1934